Abidi, Abedi or Al-Abedi is the surname for a family noble belonging to the offspring of Prophet Muhammad's great-grandson Imam Zain-ul-Abideen or Imam Abid whose real name was Ali ibn Husayn. They are a subset of the Banu Hashem Tribe and  belong to the Sayyid community. Abidis (or people belonging to this noble family) can be found all over the world especially in Iran, Pakistan, India and Iraq. The family's origins are mostly from Iraq however due to service to the Islamic mission and often persecution of the Prophets family over the centuries the family has migrated to several locations.

For generations the Abidi family has been essential to the spread of Islam in the Indo-Pak subcontinent.

Notable people with the surname include:
 Agha Hasan Abedi (1922–1995), Pakistani banker and founder of BCCI
 Amir Abedi  (1924–1964), Mayor of Dar es Salaam
 Asad Abidi (born 1956), Pakistani electrical engineer
 Azhar Abidi (born 1968), Pakistani Australian author and translator
 Colet Abedi, Iranian-American writer and producer
Intezar Abidi, alias Bobby, Indian politician and former
 Hasan Abidi (1929–2005), Pakistani journalist, writer and Urdu language poet
 Javed Abidi, disability rights activist
 Nain Abidi (born 1985), international cricketer from Pakistan
 Omar Abidi drummer for the English band Fightstar
 Raza Ali Abidi (born 1936), Pakistani journalist and radio broadcaster
 Razi Abedi, Pakistani writer
 Faisal Raza Abidi (born 1971), former senator representing the Pakistan Peoples Party (PPP) for Sindh Province.
Syed Ali Raza Abidi Pakistani politician of  MQM Party and also MPA of National Assembly
 Bani Abidi (born 1971), Pakistani visual artist

See also
 Robson Vicente Gonçalves (born 1979), Brazilian footballer known as Abedi
 Abid
 Abida (disambiguation)

Arabic-language surnames
Shi'ite surnames